Harun Tekin (born 17 June 1989) is a Turkish professional footballer who plays as a goalkeeper for Kasımpaşa.

International career
On 20 March 2015, Tekin was selected for the Turkey national football team to play against Netherlands and Luxembourg. He is part of the Turkish national team for Euro 2016. Tekin made his international debut for the Turkey national football team in a friendly 3-1 win over Moldova on 27 March 2017.

References

External links
 
 

1989 births
Living people
People from Menemen
Turkish footballers
Turkey international footballers
Bursaspor footballers
Fenerbahçe S.K. footballers
Kasımpaşa S.K. footballers
Association football goalkeepers
Süper Lig players
UEFA Euro 2016 players